Angela Essien is a Nigerian technology entrepreneur. She is co-founder of Schoolable, an edutech platform for education financing in Africa.

Life
Before starting her own business, Essien worked as a network engineer at Ettetronics Nigeria Limited, and also taught in several schools. She and Henry Nnalue founded Allpro as a startup in 2017. Allpro offers credit management to lenders and gives proprietors, parents and teachers access to credit.

In 2018 Allpro participated in GreenHouse Lab, Nigeria's first female-focused tech accelerator programme in partnership with Google. The company received venture functing from Microtraction shortly afterwards. Allpro's platform is now branded as Schoolable.

References

Year of birth missing (living people)
Living people
Nigerian technology businesspeople
Nigerian women in business
Financial company founders